"Revolution" is a song by the British rock band The Cult.  It was the third single from The Cult's 1985 album Love, written by Ian Astbury and Billy Duffy. The song has been described as a "power ballad".

Song construction
It has been noted that the chord progression in the song is the same as She Sells Sanctuary and Rain, the first two singles from the Love album.

References

External links
 "Revolution" at Allmusic.com
 "Revolution" at Discogs.com

Songs about revolutions
The Cult songs
1985 singles
Songs written by Billy Duffy
Songs written by Ian Astbury
1985 songs